Nicholas Camusat was a French historian born in Troyes in 1575, and died in 1655. His works are:

 Chronologia ab origine orbis, usque ad ann. 1200. 4to. 
 Promptuarium sacrarum antiquitatum Tricassinae diocesis, 1610, 8vo.
 Historia Albigensium, 1615. 
 Meslanges Historiques, 1619, 8vo.

Francis Camusat, another historian, was his great-nephew.

This article incorporates text from Watkins Biographical Dictionary, a publication now in the public domain.

17th-century French historians
Writers from Troyes
1575 births
1655 deaths
French male non-fiction writers
17th-century French male writers